Nelson Poket (born  Nelson García, October 30, 1976, in Santo Domingo, Dominican Republic) is a singer-songwriter.

Biography
He was member of the band Poket (1995–2003) then Gonzalez (2003–2006) then decided to start a solo career. Since then, he has released two studio albums; Otra Bestia – Released on June (2007), Produced by Rafael Lazzaro in New York City, with songs such as "Electrico", "La Pared" and "No Hablemos de Amor".

In October 2007, "Otra Bestia" was chosen by MTV and Smirnoff from submissions from 2,500 bands to represent the country in the contest 'La Zona del Combate'. In the same year, he was nominated for a Cassandra Award, in the category of Best Rock Band In Dominican Republic.

Bonanza (2008) was the second album released, songs include; "Mala Persona", "Las Bombas Del Armagedón", and "La Vida Mata".

Poket also had a radio show, called Generacion X about the best music highlights on US and UK, and including a part of the show dedicated to local bands and the local music scene, which himself has contributed majorly. Was kept on air for six years with himself as host. He decided to quit it (early 2010), due personal projects he wanted to develop giving more focus on his music career.

On February 9, 2010, released a new single called "Los Juegos (Que Juega la Gente)" for his upcoming album, Fulminante, which is due for release in July 2010.

As cited on various occasions, his music has been influenced by mostly indie, brit-bop and folk bands, such as Oasis, The Smiths, Richard Hawley, Voxtrot, Camera Obscura, Sean Lennon, Feist, M. Ward.

Band members
 Nelson García (lead singer, guitar)
 Eduardo Coronado (lead guitar)
 David Taveras (keyboard)
 Miguel Martinez (bass)
 René Taveras (drums)

Discography
 Otra Bestia (2007)
 Bonanza (2008)
 Fulminante (2010)

References

External links
Nelson Poket & Los Ex-Novios
Music Video for the song "Electrico" 8 March 2008.
Nelson Poket at CDBaby

1976 births
Living people
People from Santo Domingo
21st-century Dominican Republic male singers
Dominican Republic songwriters
Male songwriters